Anant Pratap Deo is an Indian politician and member of the Bharatiya Janata Party. Deo was a member of the Jharkhand Legislative Assembly from the Bhawanathpur constituency in Garhwa district as an Indian National Congress member.

Early life
He was born to Shankar Pratap Deo in Kalahandi State royal family. He attended school in Central Hindu School, kamodhya, Varanasi.

Career
He joined Indian National Congress. He won Bhawanathpur constituency  in 2009. In 2014, he joined Bharatiya Janata party.

References 

Year of birth missing (living people)
Living people
People from Garhwa district
Indian National Congress politicians from Jharkhand
Bharatiya Janata Party politicians from Jharkhand
Jharkhand MLAs 2009–2014